Roy Bejas (born 7 January 1987) is a Dutch retired professional footballer.

Club career
Bejas is a forward who was born in Kerkrade and was part of the professional Roda JC squad, but did not make an official debut with the club. He was loaned to  Fortuna Sittard in summer 2007.

He was released by Roda in 2008 and joined amateur side Groene Ster.

Personal life
After quitting professional football, Bejas took up a job in fire security service.

References

1987 births
Living people
Sportspeople from Kerkrade
Association football midfielders
Dutch footballers
Eerste Divisie players
Roda JC Kerkrade players
Fortuna Sittard players
RKSV Groene Ster players
Footballers from Limburg (Netherlands)